The 2012 Kazan Kremlin Cup was a professional tennis tournament played on indoor hard courts. It was the third edition of the tournament which was part of the 2012 ATP Challenger Tour. It took place in Kazan, Russia between 30 January and 5 February 2012.

Singles main-draw entrants

Seeds

 Rankings are as of January 24, 2012.

Other entrants
The following players received wildcards into the singles main draw:
  Aydin Akhmetshin
  Anton Manegin
  Stanislav Vovk
  Daniyal Zagidullin

The following players received entry from the qualifying draw:
  Radu Albot 
  Thomas Fabbiano
  Evgeny Kirillov 
  Mikhail Ledovskikh

The following players received entry as lucky losers:
  Illya Marchenko
  Denis Matsukevich

Champions

Singles

 Jürgen Zopp def.  Marius Copil, 7–6(7–4), 7–6(7–4)

Doubles

 Sanchai Ratiwatana /  Sonchat Ratiwatana def.  Aliaksandr Bury  /  Mateusz Kowalczyk, 6–3, 6–1

External links
Official Website
ATP official site

Kazan Kremlin Cup
2012
2012
2012 in Russian tennis
January 2012 sports events in Russia
February 2012 sports events in Russia